Gabriel Pascaru (born November 29, 1985) is a professional Romanian darts player, currently playing in World Darts Federation events.

Career
In 2018, Pascaru won the Gibraltar Open. He won the Ukraine Open in 2019.

In September 2019, Pascaru qualified for the 2020 BDO World Darts Championship as the Eastern European Qualifier, but lost 3–1 to Justin Hood in the preliminary round.

World Championship results

BDO
 2020: Preliminary round (lost to Justin Hood 1–3)

References

External links
 

Living people
Romanian darts players
1985 births
Sportspeople from Piatra Neamț